The 1972–73 season was Partick Thistle's 2nd consecutive season in the top division of Scottish football after being promoted from the Scottish Second Division in 1971.

Results
All results are written with Partick Thistle's score first.

Scottish League Division One
 2 September 1972 Dumbarton (h) 4-1
 9 September 1972 Rangers (a) 1-2
 16 September 1972 Arbroath (h) 1-2
 23 September 1972 Airdrieonians (a) 3-1
 30 September 1972 Falkirk (h) 0-0
 7 October 1972 Ayr United (a) 1-2
 14 October 1972 Celtic (h) 0-4
 21 October 1972 Hibernian (h) 1-3
 28 October 1972 East Fife (a) 1-0
 4 November 1972 Aberdeen (h) 0-2
 11 November 1972 Dundee United (a) 3-0
 18 November 1972 Motherwell (h) 0-3
 25 November 1972 Heart of Midlothian (a) 0-2
 2 December 1972 Kilmarnock (a) 3-2 
 9 December 1972 Morton (h) 1-0 
 16 December 1972 Dundee (a) 1-4
 23 December 1972 St Johnstone (h) 1-1
 30 December 1972 Dumbarton (a) 2-4 
 1 January 1973 Rangers (h) 0-1
 6 January 1973 Arbroath (a) 1-2
 13 January 1973 Airdrieonians (h) 2-0
 20 January 1973 Falkirk (a) 3-0
 27 January 1973 Ayr United (h) 1-2
 10 February 1973 Celtic (a) 1-1
 3 March 1973 East Fife (h) 1-1
 10 March 1973 Aberdeen (a) 0-0
 13 March 1973 Hibernian (a) 0-2
 21 March 1973 Dundee United (h) 0-3
 24 March 1973 Motherwell (a) 0-0
 31 March 1973 Heart of Midlothian (h) 3-0
 7 April 1973 Kilmarnock (h) 1-1
 14 April 1973 Morton (a) 0-5
 21 April 1973 Dundee (h) 1-1
 28 April 1973 St Johnstone 3-1

Scottish Cup
 3 February 1973 r3 St Mirren (a) 1-0  
 24 February 1973 r4 Dumbarton (a) 2-2  
 28 February 1973 r4 replay Dumbarton (h) 3-1
 17 March 1973 r5 Ayr United (h) 1-5

References

Partick Thistle F.C. seasons
Partick Thistle